Artasyrus (Old Iranian: Rtasūrā) was recorded as being the Satrap of Armenia during the reign of king Artaxerxes II. Referred to as the "King's Eye", Artasyrus was of Bactrian origin. His more "well known" son, Orontes, who was therefore sometimes referred to as "Orontes the Bactrian", served as the Satrap of Sophene and Matiene (Mitanni) during the reign of Artaxerxes II. There appears to be confusion in the historical records as to whether Artasyrus and Artaxerxes II were the same person. The daughter of Artaxerxes II, Rhodogune, was the wife of the satrap Orontes I. There are few English language sources to fully explain who he was, when he was born or died.

According to H. Khachatrian, one of the rare accounts of Ardashir was that before his death he gathered his sons and told them that the duty of every king of the Orontid Dynasty was to build at least one water channel, which would last for centuries; as he had not managed to build one, he left all his fortune to his sons for them to build them for him.

See also
Satrapy of Armenia

References

Sources
 
 

Orontid dynasty
5th-century BC rulers
Year of birth unknown
Year of death unknown
Artaxerxes II
Achaemenid satraps of Armenia
5th-century BC Iranian people